Noémie Saglio (born 1 March 1982) is a French film director and screenwriter.

Filmography

References

External links
 

1982 births
Living people
French film actresses
French film directors
21st-century French actresses
French women film directors
French women screenwriters
French screenwriters